Bièvres is a commune in the Essonne department and Île-de-France region of north-central France.

The commune derives its name from that of the River Bièvre which flows through the village. Bièvre is the old French word for a beaver (castor in modern French), so that the original meaning of the name of this stream is "beaver river".

The inhabitants of Bièvres are known in French as les Bièvrois.

See also
Communes of the Essonne department

References

Gallery

External links

 Official website 

Land use (IAU ÎdF) 
Mayors of Essonne Association 

Communes of Essonne